Inside Scientology may refer to::

 Inside Scientology: How I Joined Scientology and Became Superhuman, 1972 book by Robert Kaufman
 Inside Scientology: meine Erfahrungen im Machtapparat der "Church", 1996 book by Peter Vossmerbäumer
 Inside Scientology: The Story of America's Most Secretive Religion, 2011 book by Janet Reitman
 Inside Scientology, a television series on Scientology Network